The Austrian Judo Federation ( - ÖJV) is the national organisation for judo in Austria. The president is POIGER Martin. The Austrian Judo Federation is affiliated with the International Judo Federation. Its headquarters are in Vienna.

In 2010 the Austrian Judo Federation played host to the European Championships in Vienna, which were attended by Vladimir Putin.

Board 
 President: Martin Poiger
 Vice Presidents: Sabrina Filzmoser, Gerald Eidenberger, Albert Gmeiner, Jochen Haidvogel, Hans Peter Zopf
 Athlete Spokesperson: Magdalena Krssakova
 Finance Officer: Silvia Ehrengruber
 Legal Secretary: Andreas Weinzierl
 Technical Director: Thomas Stückler
 Deputy: Karin Dorfinger, Veronika Jakl, Horst Felzl, Martin Stump

Austrian judokas
 Peter Seisenbacher, two-time Olympic gold medallist
 Michaela Polleres, Olympic silver medallist
 Ludwig Paischer, Olympic silver medallist
 Claudia Heill (1982–2011), Olympic silver medallist
 Shamil Borchashvili, Olympic bronze medallist
 Josef Reiter, Olympic bronze medallist

National League

The Austrian Judo Federation organizes the Judo-Bundesliga. This is the national league. It is devided into the Ersten Judo-Bundesliga and the Zweite Judo-Bundesliga for men and the Damen Judo-Bundesliga for women. The league exists since 1948.

See also

List of judo organizations
European Judo Union

References

External links
 Österreichischer Judoverband

Judo
Judo organizations
National members of the International Judo Federation